Pulp was an American manga magazine and literary imprint published by Viz Media from 1997 to 2002. The magazine, which primarily published English-language translations of seinen manga, was the first English-language magazine that published manga aimed at an adult readership.

History 
During the anime boom of the 1990s, the initial wave of manga and anime titles localized for English-language audiences were aimed at children, such as Sailor Moon and Pokémon. Upon launching in 1997, Pulp became the first English-language manga magazine to publish manga aimed at an adult audience, and emerged as one of several magazines (along with Raijin Comics, Animerica Extra, and others) to publish manga titles aimed at demographics outside of children's manga.

Pulp published editorial features, media reviews, and longform articles in addition to manga. The magazine expanded in February 2000 to incorporate a wider range of content on Japanese culture, such as photography from Nobuyoshi Araki, reviews by Heinz Insu Fenkl, and "Vulgarity Drifting Diary", a column by sex worker Hikaru Natsumi, nearly doubling the size of the print edition in the process. Pulp also published Pulp Books, a line of non-fiction books created in partnership with Cadence Books.

Sales for Pulp were consistently low. In May 2002, Viz announced that Pulp would cease publication with its August 2002 issue, published in July of that year. The final issue of the magazine focused on contributor interpretations of the theme of "Manga Hell", including the erotic comics of Osamu Tezuka and the horror comics of Kazuo Koike. The magazine's unfinished serialization of Banana Fish continued in Animerica Extra (which itself would fold in 2004), while other titles were published directly as graphic novels by Viz under their Editor's Choice imprint.

Serializations 
The following titles were serialized in Pulp:

Bakune Young by 
Banana Fish by Akimi Yoshida
Benkei in New York by Jinpachi Mori and Jiro Taniguchi
Cinderalla by Junko Mizuno
Dance till Tomorrow by Naoki Yamamoto
Even a Monkey Can Draw Manga by Koji Aihara and Kentaro Takekuma
Heartbroken Angels by 
No. 5 by Taiyō Matsumoto
Phoenix by Osamu Tezuka
Short Cuts by Usamaru Furuya
Strain by Buronson and Ryoichi Ikegami
Tekkonkinkreet by Taiyō Matsumoto
Uzumaki by Junji Ito
Voyeur by Hideo Yamamoto
Voyeurs, Inc. by Hideo Yamamoto

Titles serialized in Pulp were also published as collected editions by Viz under a Pulp-branded literary imprint with its own unique trade dress.

Reception and legacy 
Pulp has been noted as being "instrumental in disseminating manga culture" in North America. The magazine was regarded positively by critics and commentators, with Warren Ellis calling the magazine "amongst the best things currently being published in the English language" and Wizard describing the magazine as "some of the coolest, most subversive manga being translated into English today." Reflecting on the magazine's commercial failure, Viz editor Shaenon K. Garrity described Pulp as publishing "manga most people just weren't ready for, stuff that was too smart, sexy, bloody, creepy, surreal, or just plain untranslatable for prime time."

In 2010 Viz launched the literary imprint Viz Signature and the digital distribution platform SigIKKI (an online English version of Monthly Ikki), both of which publish manga aimed at adult audiences. Pulp was noted by Viz as a forerunner to both platforms, with Viz editorial manager Leyla Aker stating that SigIKKI was jokingly referred to as "Pulp 2.0" in internal planning discussions.

See also 
 List of manga magazines published outside of Japan

Notes

References

External links 
 Pulp official website (defunct, link via Internet Archive)
 

Monthly magazines published in the United States
Anime and manga magazines
Defunct magazines published in the United States
Magazines established in 1997
Magazines disestablished in 2002
Magazines published in San Francisco